Elmwood School can refer to:
Elmwood School (Ottawa), a private girls school in Ottawa
Elmwood School (Berkeley) in Berkeley, California
Elmwood Normal School in New Zealand
Elmwood School (Somerset), a special school in Bridgewater, Somerset
Elmwood School (Croydon)

See also
Elm Wood School